The 1979–80 UAB Blazers men's basketball team represented the University of Alabama at Birmingham (UAB) in the 1979–80 NCAA Division I men's basketball season. This was head coach Gene Bartow's second season at UAB. The Blazers competed in the Sun Belt Conference and played their home games at the BJCC Arena. They finished the season 18–12, 10–4 in Sun Belt play and lost in the finals of the conference tournament to VCU. They were invited to the 1980 National Invitation Tournament (NIT) only to fall in the first round to Southwestern Louisiana.

Roster

Schedule and results
UAB finished the regular season tied for second place in the Sun Belt, and as runner-up in the conference tournament. The Blazers competed in the postseason for the first time in the history of the program with an appearance in the NIT.

|-
!colspan=6| 1980 Sun Belt Conference Men's Basketball Tournament

|-
!colspan=6| 1980 National Invitation Tournament

References

UAB Blazers men's basketball seasons
Uab
Uab
UAB Blazers
UAB Blazers